A den is a small room in a house where people can pursue activities in private.

In North America, the type of rooms described by the term den varies considerably by region. It is used to describe many different kinds of bonus rooms, including family rooms, libraries, home cinemas, spare bedrooms, studies or retreats. 

The etymology of "den" stems from an animal's den, such as the American black bear, among others.

In some places, particularly in parts of the British Isles, a small den may be known as a snug.

While living rooms tend to be used for entertaining company on formal occasions, dens, like other family rooms, tend to lean toward the more informal. In houses that do not have dedicated family rooms or recreation rooms, a den may fill that niche. Dens can also be private areas primarily used by adult members of the household, possibly restricting access to the room by their children. Dens with home  theatre systems and large screen televisions may be referred to as media rooms instead. 

Dens can serve the same purpose as cabinets in the past, becoming a modern man cave – a place for men to gather and entertain. In such cases, the design and decor may be distinctively masculine.

References

External links 
 

Rooms